Mustard is a database that tracks Antimicrobial Resistance Determinants (ARDs). The method by which it tracks ARDs is using their own method adapted from Protein Homology Modelling called Pairwise Comparative Modelling (PCM), which increase specificity protein prediction, especially for distantly related protein homologues. Using PCM, 6095 ARDs from 20 families in the human gut microbiota. Antibiotic resistance databases used were ResFinder, ARG-ANNOT, the now defunct Lahey Clinic, Marilyn Roberts website for tetracycline and macrolide resistance genes and metagenomics.

See also 
 Antimicrobial Resistance databases

References 

Antimicrobial resistance organizations